Beata Kocik (born June 30, 1963, in Częstochowa) – is a Polish politician and local official.

Biography 
She graduated from the Jan Długosz University. Kocik is a member of Law and Justice. She was a councilor from 2010 to 2014 in the Częstochowa City Council. In 2014 local elections she successfully applied for a seat in the Silesian Regional Assembly. In 2018 local elections she managed to get reelection, furthermore she was nominated to the office of vice-chairperson of the regional council in 2018.

References 

21st-century Polish women politicians
1963 births
Living people
Law and Justice politicians